ICFAI University may refer to one of several Institute of Chartered Financial Analysts of India universities in India:

 ICFAI Foundation for Higher Education, formerly ICFAI University, in Hyderabad, Telangana
 ICFAI University, Dehradun, in Uttarakhand
 ICFAI University, Himachal Pradesh
 ICFAI University, Jaipur, in Rajasthan
 ICFAI University, Jharkhand
 ICFAI University, Meghalaya
 ICFAI University, Mizoram
 ICFAI University, Nagaland
 ICFAI University, Raipur, in Chhattisgarh
 ICFAI University, Sikkim
 ICFAI University, Tripura